Radical 3 or radical dot meaning "to indicate an end" is one of six of the 214  Kangxi radicals that are composed of only one stroke.

In the Kangxi Dictionary, there are only 10 characters (out of 49,030) to be found under this radical.

 is also the 3rd indexing component in the Table of Indexing Chinese Character Components predominantly adopted by Simplified Chinese dictionaries published in mainland China.

Evolution

Derived characters

In calligraphy

The only stroke in radical one, known as  diǎn "dot", is called  cè in the eight principles of the character 永 ( Yǒngzì Bāfǎ) which are the basis of Chinese calligraphy.

References

Literature

External links 

 Unihan Database - U+4E36

003
003